Hypericum tertiaerum is an extinct species of the genus Hypericum.

Taxonomy 
While Hypericum tertiaerum has sufficient identifying characteristics to place it within the genus Hypericum, there is not enough surviving detail to assign it to any subdivisions within the genus.

References 

tertiaerum